One aspect of energy poverty is lack of access to clean, modern fuels and technologies for cooking. As of 2020, more than 2.6 billion people in developing countries routinely cook with fuels such as wood, animal dung, coal, or kerosene. Burning these types of fuels in open fires or traditional stoves causes harmful household air pollution, resulting in an estimated 3.8 million deaths annually according to the World Health Organization (WHO), and contributes to various health, socio-economic, and environmental problems.

A high priority in global sustainable development is to make clean cooking facilities universally available and affordable. Stoves and appliances that run on electricity, liquid petroleum gas (LPG), piped natural gas (PNG), biogas, alcohol, and solar heat meet WHO guidelines for clean cooking. Universal access to clean cooking facilities would have large benefits for environmental protection and for gender equality.

Stoves that burn wood and other solid fuels more efficiently than traditional stoves are known as "improved cookstoves" or "clean cookstoves". With very few exceptions, these stoves deliver fewer health benefits than stoves that use liquid or gaseous fuels. However, they reduce fuel usage and thus help to prevent environmental degradation. Improved cookstoves are an important interim solution in areas where deploying cleaner technologies is less feasible.

Initiatives to encourage cleaner cooking practices have yielded limited success. For various practical, cultural, and economic reasons, it is common for families who adopt clean stoves and fuels to continue to make frequent use of traditional fuels and stoves.

Issues with traditional cooking fuels

Health impacts 

As of 2020, more than 2.6 billion people in developing countries rely on burning polluting biomass fuels such as wood, dry dung, coal, or kerosene for cooking, which causes harmful household air pollution and also contributes significantly to outdoor air pollution. The World Health Organization (WHO) estimates that cooking-related pollution causes 3.8 million annual deaths. The Global Burden of Disease study estimated the number of deaths in 2017 at 1.6 million.

In traditional cooking facilities, smoke is typically vented into the home rather than out through a chimney. Solid fuel smoke contains thousands of substances, many of which are hazardous to human health. The most well understood of these substances are carbon monoxide (CO); small particulate matter; nitrous oxide; sulfur oxides; a range of volatile organic compounds, including formaldehyde, benzene and 1,3-butadiene; and polycyclic aromatic compounds, such as benzo-a-pyrene, which are thought to have both short and long term health consequences.

Exposure to household air pollution (HAP) nearly doubles the risk of childhood pneumonia and is responsible for 45 percent of all pneumonia deaths in children under five years of age. Emerging evidence shows that HAP is also a risk factor for cataracts, the leading cause of blindness in lower-middle-income countries, and low birth weight. Cooking with open fires or unsafe stoves is a leading cause of burns among women and children in developing countries.

Impacts on women and girls 
Health effects are concentrated among women, who are likely to be responsible for cooking, and young children.  The work of gathering fuel exposes women and children to safety risks and often consumes 15 or more hours per week, constraining their available time for education, rest, and paid work. Women and girls must often walk long distances to obtain cooking fuel, and, as a result, face increased risk of physical and sexual violence. Many children, particularly girls, may not attend school in order to help their mothers with firewood collection and food preparation.

Environmental impacts 
Traditional cooking facilities are highly inefficient, allowing heat to escape into the open air. The inefficiency of fuel burning results in more wood needing to be harvested and also causes emissions of black carbon, a contributor to climate change. Serious local environmental damage, including desertification, can be caused by excessive harvesting of wood and other combustible material.

While biomass harvesting in sensitive areas is problematic, it is now determined that the great majority of biomass clearing is due to agricultural expansion and land conversion. Use of crop residue and animal waste for domestic energy has detrimental results on soil quality and agricultural and livestock productivity as it means these materials are not available as soil conditioners, organic fertilizer, and livestock fodder.

Terminology 
The term "clean cookstove" has often been used without defining what the term means. Organizations vary in how they define "clean":
 According to the WHO, cooking facilities are "clean" if their emissions of carbon monoxide and fine particulate matter are below certain levels. 
 The Clean Cooking Alliance uses the term "clean cooking" more broadly. Its definition includes what the WHO refers to as "improved cookstoves", i.e. stoves that burn biomass fuel more efficiently than traditional stoves. As of 2020, the vast majority of stoves that burn biomass fuel do not qualify as clean under WHO standards even if they are more efficient than traditional stoves.

The WHO has criticized the marketing of biomass cookstoves as "improved" when they have not been tested against standards and their health benefits are unclear.

WHO-recommended clean cooking facilities 

A high priority in global sustainable development is to make clean cooking facilities universally available and affordable.

According to the WHO, stoves and appliances that are powered by electricity, liquid petroleum gas (LPG), piped natural gas (PNG), biogas, alcohol, and solar heat are "clean". Best-in-class fan gasifier stoves that burn biomass pellets can be classified as clean cooking facilities if they are correctly operated and the pellets have sufficiently low levels of moisture, but these stoves are not widely available.

Electricity can be used to power appliances such as electric pressure cookers, rice cookers, and highly efficient induction stoves, in addition to standard electric stoves. Electric induction stoves are so efficient that they create less pollution than liquified petroleum gas (LPG) even when connected to coal power sources, and are sometimes cheaper. For stews, beans, rice and other foods that can be adapted to electric pressure cookers, the savings are even greater.. As of 2019, 770 million people do not have access to electricity, and for many others electricity is not affordable or reliable. Because access to electricity is also a high priority in global sustainable development, integrated planning for new and improved electricity infrastructure that includes both typical electric loads as well as cooking loads is beginning to gain momentum. Indeed, this kind of integrated resource planning for electricity systems may deliver faster and lower-cost solutions to both access to electricity and to clean cooking.

Natural gas stoves, which are widely used in richer countries, are not without health risks. They emit high levels of nitrogen dioxide, an atmospheric pollutant that is linked to oxidative stress and acute reduction in lung function. Studies on the effects of indoor cooking with natural gas have yielded inconsistent results. According to a 2010 meta-analysis, the evidence suggests that the practice leads to small reductions in lung function in children, and that children with allergies may be more susceptible.

Biogas digesters convert waste, such as human waste and animal dung, into a methane-rich gas that burns cleanly. Biogas systems are a promising technology in areas where each household has at least two large animals to provide dung, and a steady supply of water is also available.

Solar cookers collect and concentrate the sun's heat when sunshine is available.

Improved cook stoves

Improved cook stoves (ICS), often marketed as "clean cookstoves", are biomass stoves that generally burn biomass more efficiently than traditional stoves and open fires.

Compared to traditional cook stoves, ICS are usually more fuel-efficient and aim to reduce the negative health impacts associated with exposure to toxic smoke. As of 2016, no widely-available biomass stoves meet the standards for clean cooking as defined by the WHO. A 2020 review found only one biomass stove on the market that met WHO standards in field conditions.

Despite their limitations, ICS are an important interim solution where deploying fully clean solutions that use electricity, gas, or alcohol is less feasible.  As of 2009, less than 30% of people who cook with some sort of biomass stove use ICS.

Benefits and limitations 
Improved cookstoves are more efficient, meaning that the stove's users spend less time gathering wood or other fuels, while reducing deforestation and air pollution. However, a closed stove may result in production of more soot and ultra-fine particles than an open fire would. Some designs also make the stove safer, preventing burns that often occur when children stumble into open fires.

The efficiency improvements of ICS do not necessarily translate into meaningful reductions in health risks because for certain conditions, such as childhood pneumonia, the relationship between pollution levels and effects on the body has been shown to be non-linear. This means, for example, that a 50 percent reduction in exposure would not halve the health risk. A 2020 systematic review found that ICS usage led to modest improvements in terms of blood pressure, shortness of breath, emissions of cancer-causing substances, and cardiovascular diseases, but no improvements in pregnancy outcomes or children's health.

Substantial variations in emissions and fuel consumption have been observed across ranges of cookstove designs and between laboratory and field test conditions. At present, a standard testing mechanism does not exist to establish the true impact of alternative cookstove designs as well as descriptive language for exposure. Stove testing studies are not always consistent depending largely on the discipline of investigators and their scientific specialization.

The World Health Organization encourages further research to develop biomass stove technology that is low-emission, affordable, durable, and meets users' needs.

Non-technological interventions
Behavioral change interventions, in reducing childhood household exposures, have the potential to reduce household air pollution exposure by 20 to 98%. Indoor Air Pollution (IAP) exposure can be greatly reduced by cooking outdoors, reducing time spent in the cooking area, keeping the kitchen door open while cooking, avoid leaning over the fire while attending to the  meal preparation, staying away while carrying children when cooking and keeping the children away from the cooking area. Negative impacts can also be reduced by changes to the environment (e.g. use of a chimney), drying fuel wood before use, and using a lid during cooking.

Opportunities to educate communities on reducing household indoor air pollution exposure include festival collaborations, religious meetings, and medical outreach clinics. Community health workers represent a significant resource for educating communities to help raise awareness regarding reducing the effects of indoor air pollution.

Challenges

Many users of clean stoves and fuels continue to make frequent use of traditional fuels and stoves, a phenomenon known as "fuel stacking" or "stove stacking". For instance, a recent study in Kenya found that households that are primary LPG users consume 42 percent as much charcoal as households that are primary charcoal users.

When stacking is practiced, the introduction of clean cooking facilities may not reduce household air pollution enough to make a meaningful difference in health outcomes. There are many reasons to continue to use traditional fuels and stoves, such as unreliable fuel supply, the cost of fuel, the ability of stoves to accommodate different types of pots and cooking techniques, and the need to travel long distances to repair stoves.

Research and implementation efforts are frequently pursued with insufficient coordination with supporting organizations, which, in many cases has led to widespread implementation of so called "improved" stoves that have sometimes failed to deliver on the promise of reducing indoor air pollution. Cookstove implementation efforts have often achieved mixed results because of technical and social complexities, such as the need to involve both women (who typically are responsible for cooking) and men (who typically control household spending).

Efforts to improve access to clean cooking fuels and stoves have barely kept up with population growth, and current and planned policies would still leave 2.4 billion people without access in 2030.

Environmental and sustainable development effects 

Transitioning to cleaner cooking methods is expected to either slightly raise greenhouse gas emissions or decrease emissions, even if the replacement fuels are fossil fuels. There is evidence that switching to LPG and PNG has a smaller climate effect than the combustion of solid fuels, which emits methane and black carbon. The burning of residential solid fuels accounts for up to 58 percent of global black carbon emissions. The Intergovernmental Panel on Climate Change stated in 2018, "The costs of achieving nearly universal access to electricity and clean fuels for cooking and heating are projected to be between 72 and 95 billion USD per year until 2030 with minimal effects on GHG emissions."

Universal access to clean cooking is an element of the UN Sustainable Development Goal 7, whose first target is: "By 2030, ensure universal access to affordable, reliable and modern energy services".  Progress in clean cooking would facilitate progress in other Sustainable Development goals, such as eliminating poverty (Goal 1), good health and well-being (Goal 3), gender equality (Goal 5), and climate action (Goal 13). An indicator of Goal 7 is the proportion of population with primary reliance on clean fuels and technologies for cooking, heating, and lighting, using the WHO's definition of "clean".

See also

Energy poverty
Indoor air pollution in developing nations
Sustainable energy

References

Book sources
 
 

Sustainable energy
International development
Air pollution
Cooking
Environmental health
Sustainable development
Women's health